Howard Vincent O’Brien (1888–1947) was an American novelist and journalist best known for his memoir Wine, Women and War and his columns for the Chicago Daily News, "All Things Considered" and "Footnotes".  O’Brien was born in Chicago in 1888, where he lived for his entire life, save for his time at Yale University and fighting in World War I.

O’Brien worked as an editor of the Printers' Ink magazine, and moved on from this endeavor to found Art magazine before becoming a first lieutenant of artillery in World War I. By 1920, he had written several novels, including Trodden Gold, An Abandoned Woman, Thirty, and his anonymous autobiography, Wine, Women, and War. He became the literary editor of the Chicago Daily News in 1928, where he also contributed the column "All Things Considered", which he wrote until his death in 1947.

References

External links
 
 
 Howard O’Brien Papers at Newberry Library

1888 births
20th-century American novelists
American male novelists
American columnists
20th-century American memoirists
Writers from Chicago
1947 deaths
20th-century American male writers
Novelists from Illinois
American male non-fiction writers